Sportivo Huracán is a Peruvian football club, based in the city of Arequipa, Peru.

The club was founded on January 12, 1927.   Sportivo Huracán now plays in the Copa Perú, which is the third division of the Peruvian league after deciding to no longer participate in the Peruvian Segunda División.

History

The club was the 1973 Copa Perú champion, defeating Cienciano, Colegio Nacional Iquitos, and Octavio Espinoza de Ica in the process.

The club once played in the Torneo Descentralizado, the highest level of Peruvian football league, until 1973  when the team opted to move down a division.

In the 2010 Copa Perú, the club classified to the National Stage, but was eliminated by Alianza Unicachi of Puno in the quarterfinals.

In the 2011 Torneo Intermedio, the club was eliminated by Sport Áncash in the Round of 16.

In the 2011 Copa Perú, the club classified to the National Stage, but was eliminated by Real Garcilaso of Cuzco in the quarterfinals.

It was invited to play in the Peruvian Segunda División from the 2013 season on.

Rivalries
Sportivo Huracán has had a long-standing rivalry with Melgar, Aurora, and Piérola.

Honours

National
Copa Perú:
Winners (1): 1973
Runner-up (2): 1975, 1995

Regional
Región VII:
Winners (3): 2010, 2011, 2012

Liga Departamental de Arequipa:
Winners (12): 1966, 1972, 1974, 1976, 1977, 1978, 1980, 1990, 1995, 1999, 2003, 2018
Runner-up (3): 2010, 2015, 2017

Liga Provincial de Arequipa:
Winners (2): 2003, 2015
Runner-up (2): 1967, 2017

Liga Superior de Arequipa:
Winners (1): 2010

Liga Distrital de Arequipa:
Winners (3): 2015, 2017, 2018

See also
List of football clubs in Peru
Peruvian football league system

Football clubs in Peru
Association football clubs established in 1927
1927 establishments in Peru